Leon Douglas (born August 26, 1954) is an American basketball coach and former professional player. He played seven seasons in the National Basketball Association (NBA) before transitioning to an extensive professional career overseas in Europe.  After retiring, Douglas went into coaching, leading several HBCU programs in his home state of Alabama in his career.

Amateur career
Born in Leighton, Alabama, Douglas played high school basketball at Colbert County High School, and was named a Parade All-American in his 1971-72 senior year.  He played collegiately at Alabama, where he was a two-time All-Southeastern Conference first-team selection and two-time SEC Player of the Year.  Douglas played at Alabama for coach CM Newton, who would start five black players in a time of racial turbulence and progress.  Douglas said, "We knew Coach Newton (signed us) because he wanted to win.  He wasn't trying to be a trailblazer. You have to respect a man for putting five black starters on the court when others said it was a no-no."  On December 28, 1973, in a 65-55 win at Louisville Cardinals men's basketball, Newton started Douglas, Charles "Boonie" Russell, Charles Cleveland, T.R. Dunn and Ray Odums for the first all-black starting line-up in SEC history, and a team that would win the SEC season title.

Douglas helped Alabama to new heights, reaching the NCAA tournament for the first time in program history in 1975, and then following up in the 1976 NCAA tournament with the program's first post-season victory, a 79-64 victory over North Carolina, with Douglas scoring 35 points. The team would lose in the next round, 74-69, to eventual national champion Indiana, and finished the season ranked 6th in polls.  In his senior year, he averaged a double-double of 20.6 ppg and 12.4 rpg, and was named a third team All-American.

Douglas was also a member of the United States national basketball team that won a gold medal at the 1975 Pan American Games.

Professional career
Douglas was the first Crimson Tide player to be selected in the first round of the NBA draft when he was chosen fourth overall by the Detroit Pistons in 1976. He went on to play four years (1976-1980) with the Pistons, peaking with averages of 11.4 ppg and 8.5 rpg in the 1978–79 Detroit Pistons season, backing up Hall of Famer Bob Lanier, who called Douglas, "One of the strongest men I ever played against."  Douglas was plagued by a tendency to commit personal fouls with his physical style of play, finishing three seasons (1976-1979) in the top-20 of fouls committed, all while playing as a reserve. Also, relative to his draft position and the depth of the 1976 draft, the selection of Douglas would come to be viewed with some frustration as four Hall of Fame players (Adrian Dantley, Robert Parish, Alex English and Dennis Johnson) were all selected after Douglas.

He then signed as a veteran free agent with the Kansas City Kings in 1980, with Detroit receiving a compensatory pick in return, which they used to draft Kelly Tripucka in the 1981 NBA draft.  Douglas played for the Kings as a reserve through the start of the 1982-83 Kansas City Kings season, when he was released, bringing his NBA career to a close. Over seven NBA seasons, Douglas averaged 7.9 ppg and 6.5 rpg.

Douglas then pursued overseas opportunities, initially with Limoges CSP in France, helping the team to win the 1983-84 LNB Pro A league title, and then in Serie A in Italy, with Fortitudo Bologna (1984–87) and then with Olimpia Basket Pistoia (1987–91) where, for two seasons (1987-1989) he paired with Joe "Jellybean" Bryant, who was raising his son Kobe Bryant.  Kobe would work at the games as a ball and mop boy and would practice shooting at halftime, with Douglas sharing, "At every one of our games at halftime, it was the Kobe show.  He'd get out there and get his shot up.  We'd come out of the locker room at halftime and have to chase him off the court".  Douglas finished his playing career with Pallacanestro Trieste in 1992.

Coaching career

Douglas would return to basketball and became the head coach at Stillman College in 2004. In his first two seasons at Stillman, Douglas led the Tigers to the 2006 Southern Intercollegiate Athletic Conference (SIAC) Tournament championship and advanced to the NCAA Division II Tournament.

He also coached the semi-professional Magic City King Courts (Magic City is a nickname for Birmingham, Alabama) of the World Basketball Association for their 2005 season. The team withdrew from the WBA in 2006 and was later suspended.

Douglas then left Stillman in 2006 to become the head basketball coach at Tuskegee University. The Tuskegee Golden Tigers won three SIAC titles with Douglas at the helm and in his final season, advanced to the Elite Eight in the 2014 NCAA Division II men's basketball tournament, the furthest an SIAC school had advanced in tournament history.  Douglas won the 2014 NCAA Division II Coach of the Year award, despite having been suspended for six games in the season after two players suffered heat exhaustion in pre-season workouts, and would then leave the university after a contract dispute.

After his departure from Tuskegee, Douglas was hired as the head basketball coach at Miles College in 2014. In his second season, Miles won 17 games, more than the school had won in the previous three years combined.  Still, he was dismissed after his third season with an overall record of 27-57.

After overcoming a cancer diagnosis, Douglas coached high school at Cordova High School in Cordova, Alabama starting in 2019.  He also hosted a youth basketball clinic in his home state in 2021.

Personal life
Douglas appeared as a member of the Detroit team in the cult classic basketball film The Fish That Saved Pittsburgh in 1979 alongside Pistons teammates Lanier, Eric Money, John Shumate, Chris Ford, and Kevin Porter.

Douglas was inducted into the Colbert County Sports Hall of Fame in 2002 and the Alabama Sports Hall of Fame in 2006.  His younger brother John Douglas played college basketball for Kansas, played two seasons in the NBA for the San Diego Clippers and then joined his brother to play in Europe.

References

External links

1954 births
Living people
African-American basketball coaches
African-American basketball players
Alabama Crimson Tide men's basketball players
All-American college men's basketball players
American expatriate basketball people in France
American expatriate basketball people in Italy
American men's basketball coaches
American men's basketball players
Basketball coaches from Alabama
Basketball players at the 1975 Pan American Games
Basketball players from Alabama
Centers (basketball)
College men's basketball head coaches in the United States
Detroit Pistons draft picks
Detroit Pistons players
High school basketball coaches in Alabama
Kansas City Kings players
Lega Basket Serie A players
Limoges CSP players
Medalists at the 1975 Pan American Games
Miles Golden Bears men's basketball coaches
Olimpia Basket Pistoia players
Pan American Games gold medalists for the United States
Pan American Games medalists in basketball
Parade High School All-Americans (boys' basketball)
People from Colbert County, Alabama
Power forwards (basketball)
Reyer Venezia players
Stillman Tigers men's basketball coaches
Tuskegee Golden Tigers men's basketball coaches
Virtus Bologna players
21st-century African-American people
20th-century African-American sportspeople